Beočić (Serbian Cyrillic: Беочић) is a village in Šumadija and Western Serbia (Šumadija), in the municipality of Rekovac (Region of Levač), lying at , at the elevation of 220 m. According to the 2002 census, the village had 572 citizens.

External links
 Levac Online
 Article about Beočić
 Pictures from Beočić

Populated places in Pomoravlje District
Šumadija